Senecio malacitanus, also known as Senecio linifolius is a species of plant from South Africa.

Description 
The young stems are densely leafy and hey turn grey with age. The leaves are narrow and fleshy. Flowers are present between October and July. They are very small. Yellow disc shaped flowers grow in branched inflorescences. The cylindrical seeds have ribs with short hairs.

Distribution and habitat 
This plant is found growing on stony slopes between Humansdorp and the Eastern Cape of South Africa. It is found in a wide variety of habitats, including the Karoo, Albany Thicket, grassland, fynbos and renosterveld.

Conservation 
This species is considered to be of least concern by the South African National Biodiversity Instittute. It is common and widespread so faces little risk of extinction.

References 

malacitanus
Fauna of South Africa
Plants described in 1905